The Lisbon Holy House of Mercy MHIH is a Portuguese charitable organisation that, in modern times, serves also as the national lottery and off-course betting operator. In spite of its historical links to the Catholic Church, it is today a secular legal person in the public administrative interest, that is to say, a private legal person, recognised by the authorities as pursuing non-profit-making objects of public interest.

The first of its kind (though many other local Misericórdias were established, throughout Portugal and its overseas colonies), it was established in 1498 by Queen Regent Eleanor of Viseu, as a Brotherhood with the Invocation of Our Lady of Mercy (headquartered in a chapel of the Lisbon Cathedral) comprising "one hundred men of good reputation and sound conscience and honest life" that vowed to support the neediest and to uphold the Fourteen Works of Mercy.

Although a private legal person, the Misericórdia is overseen by the public administration, namely the Minister in charge of the social security system; its Chairman (Provedor), who presides over the Board of Directors, is nominated by the Prime Minister.

See also
 List of Jesuit sites

References

External links
Santa Casa da Misericórdia de Lisboa

1498 establishments in Portugal
15th century in Portugal
15th-century Catholicism
Catholic charities
Charities based in Portugal
Fraternities and sororities in Portugal